Brian E. Lampton is an American politician who is currently the Ohio state representative in Ohio's 73rd district. He won the seat after incumbent Republican Rick Perales became termlimited after completing his fourth term in office. He defeated Democrat Kim McCarthy in 2020, winning 57.5% to 42.6%.

References

Living people
Republican Party members of the Ohio House of Representatives
21st-century American politicians
Year of birth missing (living people)
People from Beavercreek, Ohio